Charles Jude Scicluna (born 15 May 1959) is a Canadian-Maltese prelate of the Roman Catholic Church who has been the Archbishop of Malta since 2015. He held positions in the Roman Curia from 1995 to 2012, when he was appointed Auxiliary Bishop of Malta. Both as a curial official and since becoming a bishop he has conducted investigations into sexual abuse by clergy on behalf of the Holy See and led a board that reviews such cases. He has been called "the Vatican's most respected sex crimes expert". Since November 2018 he has also been an Adjunct Secretary of the Congregation for the Doctrine of the Faith, the curial body responsible for dealing with clerical sexual abuse cases on minors around the world.

Education and priesthood
Scicluna was born to Maltese parents in Toronto, Ontario, Canada, on 15 May 1959. His family moved to Qormi in Malta when he was 11 months old. In Malta, he attended St. Edward's College. After secondary school, he studied at the Major Seminary there. He went to the University of Malta in 1976 and obtained a Doctor of Laws (LLD) degree in civil law there in 1984. After completing his seminary studies and earning a Licentiate of Sacred Theology (STL) in pastoral theology at the Faculty of Theology in the Seminary at Tal-Virtù, he was ordained a priest for the Archdiocese of Malta by Archbishop Joseph Mercieca on 11 July 1986. In 1991 he also obtained a Doctorate of Canon Law (JCD) at the Pontifical Gregorian University in Rome. His thesis supervisor was Raymond Burke and he presented it to Professor Urbano Navarrete Cortés, SJ; both later became cardinals. Scicluna later said: "They wanted me to stay in Rome, in the Apostolic Signatura, but the archbishop called me back to Malta."

Between 1990 and 1995, he was defender of the bond and promoter of justice at Metropolitan Court of Malta, Professor of Pastoral Theology and Canon Law at the Faculty of Theology and Vice-Rector of the Major Seminary of the Archdiocese. His pastoral activities included service at the parishes of St. Gregory the Great in Sliema and Transfiguration in Iklin. He served as chaplain to the local Convent of St. Catherine.

Curial service
In 1995 he began his 17-year Holy See career, first as Deputy Promoter of Justice at the Supreme Tribunal of the Apostolic Signatura and then beginning in 2002 as Promoter of Justice in the Congregation for the Doctrine of the Faith under Cardinal Joseph Ratzinger. He also taught as Invited Professor at the Faculty of Law at the Pontifical Gregorian University. Between 1996 and 2007, he promoted the cause of the canonization of Saint George Preca.

As Promoter of Justice, he was credited with constructing the 2010 universal norms that extended the Church's statutes of limitations on reporting cases of sexual abuse and expanded the category of ecclesial crimes to include sexual misconduct with a disabled adult and possession of child pornography. He provided a brief history of the activities of the CDF with respect to abuse cases in a June 2010 interview.

In 2005, Ratzinger tasked Scicluna with collecting testimony about the founder of the Legionaries of Christ, Rev. Marcial Maciel, amid allegations of abuse.

At a prayer service for priests in St Peter's Basilica in May 2010, Scicluna addressed the clerical vocation and said:

He went on to quote the gospels on the corruption of the young–"Whoever causes one of these little ones who believe in me to sin, it would be better for him if a great millstone were hung around his neck and he were thrown into the sea" (Mark 9:42)–and then quoted Gregory the Great's exegesis of that verse's meaning for priests:

Addressing a conference on sexual abuse held in February 2012 at the Pontifical Gregorian University, he explained that the CDF needed the support of the entire church hierarchy for its procedures to have their intended impact: "No strategy for the prevention of child abuse will ever work without commitment and accountability." He said that "the deliberate denial of known facts, and the misplaced concern that the good name of the institution should somehow enjoy absolute priority" were "enemies of truth" and reflected "a deadly culture of silence" which he characterized as a form of omertà, the word used to describe the Mafia's code of silence to protect criminal conspiracies in the face of civil and criminal authority. He described the pastoral needs of those abused, "the radical need of the victim to be heard attentively, to be understood and believed, to be treated with dignity as he or she plods on the tiresome journey of recovery and healing", and highlighted the special care needed by those who find themselves unable to recover, "who seem to have identified 'self' simply with 'having been victims'". He told reporters that bishops needed to adhere to church law and CDF's standards: "It is a crime in canon law to show malicious or fraudulent negligence in the exercise of one's duty. I'm not saying that we should start punishing everybody for any negligence in his duties. But what I want to say is that this is not acceptable. It is not acceptable that when there are set standards, people do not follow the set standards."

Auxiliary Bishop
On 6 October 2012, Pope Benedict XVI named Scicluna Auxiliary Bishop of the Archdiocese of Malta and Titular Bishop of San Leone. The Holy See announcement described him as "highly respected among his peers around the world for his lecturing skills and his expertise in child protection issues". In an interview on the eve of his departure from Rome, Scicluna said the move was a promotion and not a manifestation of departmental rivalries within the Holy See. He said it did not indicate any alteration in policy with respect to the handling of sex abuse cases, which would continue to maintain the aggressive stance he had adopted: "This is policy. It's not Scicluna. It's the pope. And this will remain." He said he would continue to address the issue as bishop: "If you want to silence someone, you don't make him a bishop."

He was consecrated bishop on 24 November 2012 by Archbishop Paul Cremona. The co-consecrators were Archbishop Emeritus Joseph Mercieca and Bishop Mario Grech of Gozo. In his Christmas sermon the next year, Scicluna discussed the need for "strong families", later telling an interviewer that when had told the pope he was worried about the legalization of same-sex marriage and adoption by same-sex couples in Malta the pope encouraged him to speak out.

Appointments
On 1 December 2012 Pope Benedict XVI appointed Scicluna to a renewable five-year term as a member of the Congregation for the Doctrine of the Faith.

In April 2014 Scicluna was appointed by the Holy See to take the testimony of clergy alleging sexual misconduct in the Archdiocese of St Andrews and Edinburgh.

In January 2015 he was appointed to preside over the new doctrinal team dealing with appeals filed by clergy accused of abuse within the Congregation for the Doctrine of the Faith (CDF). On 13 November 2018 Francis gave him in addition the post of Adjunct Secretary of the CDF.

Archbishop of Malta
Upon the resignation of Archbishop Paul Cremona, Scicluna was appointed Apostolic Administrator of the archdiocese on 18 October 2014. During this period a number of sexual abuse cases emerged concerning a Dominican priest. On 27 February 2015 Pope Francis appointed Scicluna Metropolitan Archbishop of Malta. He was installed on 21 March 2015 in St Paul's Cathedral in Mdina.

On 30 January 2018, after Pope Francis was sharply criticized for controversial comments about the clergy sex abuse scandal in Chile, he sent Scicluna to conduct an investigation and take statements from victims who charged that Juan Barros, whom Francis named Bishop of Osorno in 2015, had personal knowledge of their abuse years earlier. On 8 April, in a letter to the bishops of Chile, Francis said that Scicluna's 2,300-page report prompted him to apologize for misrepresenting the evidence of clerical sexual abuse in Chile and to summon the bishops of Chile to Rome for consultation in May. On 11 June 2018 Francis accepted the resignation of Barros, along with the resignation of two other bishops in Chile.

Views

Sexuality
During the Vatican Abuse Summit, Italian journalist Sandro Magister asked Scicluna why the term “homosexuality” was absent from the opening day presentations of the summit. Scicluna replied, “These are human conditions [heterosexuality and homosexuality] that we recognize, that exist. But they aren’t something that really predisposes to sin."

Honours
  Russian Imperial Family: Knight Grand Cordon of the Imperial Order of Saint Stanislaus (21 June 2017)
  Russian Imperial Family: Recipient of the 400th Anniversary Medal of the House of Romanov
Knight Grand Officer of the Equestrian Order of the Holy Sepulchre of Jerusalem (2015)
Grand Prior of the Equestrian Order of the Holy Sepulchre of Jerusalem, Lieutenancy of Malta (2015)

Notes

References

External links

Living people
1959 births
People from Qormi
Clergy from Toronto
Maltese theologians
Catholic Church sexual abuse scandals in Europe
Officials of the Roman Curia
Curial response to Catholic Church sexual abuse scandals
Canon law jurists
Members of the Congregation for the Doctrine of the Faith
Legion of Christ
Archbishops of Malta
21st-century Roman Catholic archbishops in Malta
Canadian emigrants to Malta